Liquor and Poker Music is an American rock music record label based in Hawthorne, California. Bands on the label are generally in the punk, stoner rock and heavy metal genres.

Current artists
 American Heartbreak
 Backyard Babies
 Black Halos
 The Bones
 Crash Kelly
 Crucified Barbara
 Dirty Americans
 Fireball Ministry
 Fu Manchu
 Hanoi Rocks
 The Illuminati
 The Hellacopters
 Nebula
 Scott Reeder
 The Thieves

See also
 List of record labels

External links
 Official website (archived)

American record labels
Alternative rock record labels
Hawthorne, California